Chirosia gleniensis is a species of root-maggot flies in the family Anthomyiidae.

References

Anthomyiidae
Articles created by Qbugbot
Insects described in 1924